Sarfraz Rasool (born July 10, 1975) is a former Pakistani international footballer, who played for KRL FC.

Career
As a goal scoring midfielder, Rasool had been playing for KRL FC between 1999 and 2003, and was constantly in the goals for the national team.

Sarfraz won the Golden boot at the 2003 SAFF Cup with 4 goals, and was named Asian Football Confederation Player of the Month.

However, he controversially left Pakistan soon after and moved to England, which effectively ended his international career, but remained with KRL for some seasons, before eventually joining the renamed PMC Club Athletico Faisalabad in August 2008.

References

1975 births
Living people
Pakistani footballers
Pakistan international footballers
Association football midfielders